O. S. Veluchami was an Indian politician and former Member of the Legislative Assembly. He was elected to the Tamil Nadu legislative assembly as an Indian National Congress candidate from Ottapidaram constituency in 1977 election.

References 

Indian National Congress politicians from Tamil Nadu
Year of birth missing
Possibly living people
Tamil Nadu MLAs 1977–1980